Bajajnagar is a census town in the Mavli tehsil of Udaipur district, Rajasthan, India. It is situated around 18km away from Mavli and 25km away from district headquarter Udaipur.

Demographics 
According to Census India 2011 data, the population of Bajajnagar is 2,124, including 1,138 males and 986 females.

References 

Cities and towns in Udaipur district